Marazion and Perranuthnoe was an electoral division of Cornwall in the United Kingdom which returned one member to sit on Cornwall Council between 2013 and 2021. It was abolished at the 2021 local elections, being succeeded by Long Rock, Marazion and St Erth.

Councillors

Extent
Marazion and Perranuthnoe represented the town of Marazion (including St Michael's Mount), the villages of Goldsithney, St Hilary and Perranuthnoe, and the hamlets of Perran Downs, Higher Downs and Rosudgeon. The hamlet of Gwallon was shared with the Ludgvan division and the hamlet of Relubbus was shared with the Gwinear-Gwithian and St Erth division. The division covered 1928 hectares in total.

Election results

2017 election

2013 election

References

Electoral divisions of Cornwall Council
Marazion